is a passenger railway station in located in the city of Kameyama, Mie Prefecture, Japan, operated by Central Japan Railway Company (JR Tōkai).

Lines
Idagawa Station is served by the Kansai Main Line, and is 55.3 rail kilometers from the terminus of the line at Nagoya Station.

Station layout
The station consists of two opposed side platforms connected by a footbridge.

Platform

Adjacent stations

|-
!colspan=5|Central Japan Railway Company (JR Central)

Station history
Idagawa Station was opened on May 20, 1929 on the Japanese Government Railways, when the section of the Kansai Main Line connecting Suzuka with Kamayama was completed. The JGR became the Japan National Railways (JNR) after World War II. The station has been unattended since July 11, 1974. The station was absorbed into the JR Central network upon the privatization of the JNR on April 1, 1987. A new station building was completed in 2012.

Station numbering was introduced to the section of the Kansai Main Line operated JR Central in March 2018; Idagawa Station was assigned station number CI16.

Passenger statistics
In fiscal 2019, the station was used by an average of 688 passengers daily (boarding passengers only).

Surrounding area
Japan National Route 1 
Suzuka River
Nobonotsuka Kofun
Kameyama City Idagawa Elementary School

See also
 List of railway stations in Japan

References

External links

Railway stations in Japan opened in 1929
Railway stations in Mie Prefecture
Kameyama, Mie